Justice Zakaullah Lodhi (born on 28 February 1934 in Bareilly, British India to Ikramullah Khan Lodhi) was a Pakistani judge.

Biography
He migrated with his family to Pakistan in 1947. His family settled in Quetta, Balochistan, he earned his bachelor's degree from University of Punjab and his LLB from S. M. Law College, Karachi and entered into legal practice in 1960, enrolled as Advocate High Court and Supreme Court, he was the member of Balochistan Bar, assumed different roles in Balochistan Bar and also served as President of the Bar. He lectured in Balochistan Law College.

He was appointed Judge of National Industrial Relations Commission (NIRC), Islamabad before his Oath Taking as Judge High Court Sindh - Balochistan on 15 October 1974. He was the founding member of Federal Shariat Court of Pakistan and served as its Judge from 28 May 1980 to 24 March 1981.

Justice Lodhi was elevated to the highest Judicial Position of the province and took Oath as the Chief Justice of Balochistan High Court on 25 March 1981, to this position he remained until his death on 19 October 1984.

He was famous for his landmark verdicts and his literary contributions. He was a thinker, poet and authored books.  He held Honorary Membership of Various Academic, Educational and Welfare Bodies.

References

Pakistani judges
1934 births
1984 deaths
Muhajir people
Sindh Muslim Law College alumni
University of the Punjab alumni
Chief Justices of the Balochistan High Court
People from Quetta